Key is an unincorporated community in Belmont County, in the U.S. state of Ohio.

History
A post office called Key was established in 1879, and remained in operation until 1933. Key was formerly called Bethel. In addition to the post office Bethel (Key) had a train station, schoolhouse, and church.

References

Unincorporated communities in Belmont County, Ohio
1879 establishments in Ohio
Populated places established in 1879
Unincorporated communities in Ohio